The 1972–73 NBA season was the Warriors' 27th season in the NBA and 11th in the San Francisco Bay Area.

Offseason

Draft picks

Roster

Regular season

Season standings

z – clinched division title
y – clinched division title
x – clinched playoff spot

Record vs. opponents

Game log

Playoffs

|- align="center" bgcolor="#ffcccc"
| 1
| March 30
| @ Milwaukee
| L 90–110
| Rick Barry (22)
| Clyde Lee (10)
| Jim Barnett (6)
| Milwaukee Arena10,746
| 0–1
|- align="center" bgcolor="#ccffcc"
| 2
| April 1
| @ Milwaukee
| W 95–92
| Cazzie Russell (25)
| Clyde Lee (17)
| Walt Hazzard (7)
| Milwaukee Arena10,379
| 1–1
|- align="center" bgcolor="#ffcccc"
| 3
| April 5
| Milwaukee
| L 93–113
| Jeff Mullins (21)
| Clyde Lee (17)
| Jeff Mullins (4)
| Oakland–Alameda County Coliseum Arena8,493
| 1–2
|- align="center" bgcolor="#ccffcc"
| 4
| April 7
| Milwaukee
| W 102–97
| Rick Barry (38)
| Clyde Lee (21)
| Jeff Mullins (6)
| Oakland–Alameda County Coliseum Arena8,173
| 2–2
|- align="center" bgcolor="#ccffcc"
| 5
| April 10
| @ Milwaukee
| W 100–97
| Clyde Lee (21)
| Clyde Lee (18)
| Walt Hazzard (5)
| University of Wisconsin Field House12,204
| 3–2
|- align="center" bgcolor="#ccffcc"
| 6
| April 13
| Milwaukee
| W 100–86
| Jim Barnett (26)
| Clyde Lee (19)
| Jim Barnett (7)
| Oakland–Alameda County Coliseum Arena13,175
| 4–2
|-

|- align="center" bgcolor="#ffcccc"
| 1
| April 17
| @ Los Angeles
| L 99–101
| Nate Thurmond (22)
| Nate Thurmond (26)
| Thurmond, Barnett (5)
| The Forum17,505
| 0–1
|- align="center" bgcolor="#ffcccc"
| 2
| April 19
| @ Los Angeles
| L 93–104
| Rick Barry (29)
| Clyde Lee (18)
| Nate Thurmond (6)
| The Forum17,505
| 0–2
|- align="center" bgcolor="#ffcccc"
| 3
| April 21
| Los Angeles
| L 70–126
| Rick Barry (10)
| Clyde Lee (18)
| six players tied (2)
| Oakland–Alameda County Coliseum Arena13,183
| 0–3
|- align="center" bgcolor="#ccffcc"
| 4
| April 23
| Los Angeles
| W 117–109
| Cazzie Russell (33)
| Nate Thurmond (18)
| Jeff Mullins (7)
| Oakland–Alameda County Coliseum Arena8,000
| 1–3
|- align="center" bgcolor="#ffcccc"
| 5
| April 25
| @ Los Angeles
| L 118–128
| Cazzie Russell (29)
| Nate Thurmond (15)
| Thurmond, Mullins (5)
| The Forum17,505
| 1–4
|-

Awards and records
 Nate Thurmond, NBA All-Star Game
 Rick Barry, NBA All-Star Game
 Rick Barry, All-NBA Second Team
 Nate Thurmond, NBA All-Defensive Second Team

References

Golden State
Golden State Warriors seasons
Golden
Golden